White Chamber is a 2018 British science-fiction horror film written and directed by Paul Raschid. It stars Shauna Macdonald and Oded Fehr. The film is about a woman, Dr. Elle Chrysler (Macdonald), who wakes up to find herself in a white chamber, where she is tortured for information that she claims to not have.

White Chamber premiered on 5 April 2018 at the Brussels International Fantastic Film Festival, and later at the 2018 Edinburgh Film Festival. The film was released for streaming on 29 March 2019 by Netflix. The film received mixed reviews, and Macdonald's performance received praise. She won the Scottish BAFTA Award for Best Actress for her performance.

Premise 
Dr. Elle Chrysler wakes up to find herself in a white chamber, where she is tortured for information that she claims to not have.

Cast 

 Shauna Macdonald as Dr. Elle Chrysler
 Oded Fehr as Daran / Narek Zakarian
 Amrita Acharia as Ruth
 Sharon Maughan as Sandra
 Nicholas Farrell as Dr. Edgar Chrysler
 Candis Nergaard as Anya

Reception 
On Metacritic, the film has a weighted average score of 40 out of 100, based on 2 critics, indicating "mixed reviews".

References

External links 

 Official website
 
 
 

2018 films
English-language Netflix original films
2010s science fiction horror films
Films shot in London
British nonlinear narrative films
British science fiction horror films
Films about missing people
Fictional cubes
Films about mathematics
Films about science
Films set in the United Kingdom
Films set in the future
Apocalyptic films
Torture in films
2010s survival films
Dystopian films
2018 science fiction films
2018 horror films
2010s English-language films
2010s British films